Feyzabad (also Romanized as Feyẕābād) is a village in Rayen Rural District, Rayen District, Kerman County, Kerman Province, Iran. At the 2006 census, its population was 48, in 11 families.

References 

Populated places in Kerman County